Hristiyan Kozhuharov (born 12 February 1991) is a Bulgarian footballer, currently playing for Yantra Polski Trambesh as a midfielder.

References

External links

Living people
1991 births
Bulgarian footballers
Association football midfielders
PFC Vidima-Rakovski Sevlievo players
PFC Kaliakra Kavarna players
FC Dunav Ruse players
FC Yantra Gabrovo players
First Professional Football League (Bulgaria) players
People from Gabrovo